Howard Kenneth Gottfried (November 13, 1923 – December 8, 2017) was an American film producer. He produced many films, including The Hospital, Network, Torch Song Trilogy and Suburban Commando.

Gottfried served in the U.S. Army during World War II. He was raised in the Bronx and graduated from City College of New York and the New York University School of Law. He began practicing law in New York and produced off-Broadway theater in his spare time.

References

External links
 

1923 births
2017 deaths
People from Manhattan
People from Beverly Hills, California
New York University School of Law alumni
Film producers from California
Film producers from New York (state)
City College of New York alumni
People from the Bronx